Kenneth Edward Berry (born June 21, 1960) is a Canadian former professional ice hockey winger.

Early life 
Berry was born in Burnaby, British Columbia. As a youth, he and teammate Glenn Anderson played in the 1972 Quebec International Pee-Wee Hockey Tournament with a minor ice hockey team from Burnaby. He played major junior hockey with the New Westminster Bruins, winning the Memorial Cup in 1978. He next played with the University of Denver Pioneers, where he was selected to the All-WCHA Second Team in 1980–81.

Career 
Berry played major professional hockey with the NHL's Edmonton Oilers and Vancouver Canucks, tallying 8 goals and 10 assists for 18 points in 55 games. He later played in West Germany/Germany, mostly in the second tier 2nd Eishockey-Bundesliga, with ESV Bayreuth and EC Hedos München. 

Berry twice represented Canada in hockey at the Olympics, at the 1980 Winter Olympics held in Lake Placid and the 1988 Winter Olympics held in Calgary.  At the 1980 Tournament, Berry scored a hat-trick in Canada's 10-1 victory over the Netherlands.

Berry retired from hockey after the  1992–93 Bundesliga season (his only season in Germany's top level Eishockey-Bundesliga), returning to Canada to become a stockbroker. , Berry is chairman of Kootenay Silver Inc.

Personal life 
Berry is the younger brother of Doug Berry, who also played in the NHL and the Eishockey-Bundesliga.

In Nov. 2022, Berry was elected to a four-year term as mayor of Lions Bay, British Columbia, Canada.

Career statistics

Regular season and playoffs

International

Awards and honors

References

External links

Legends of Hockey

1960 births
Living people
Canadian ice hockey forwards
Denver Pioneers men's ice hockey players
Edmonton Oilers players
Sportspeople from Burnaby
Ice hockey players at the 1980 Winter Olympics
Ice hockey players at the 1988 Winter Olympics
Milwaukee Admirals (IHL) players
Moncton Alpines (AHL) players
New Westminster Bruins players
Nova Scotia Oilers players
Olympic ice hockey players of Canada
Vancouver Canucks draft picks
Vancouver Canucks players
Wichita Wind players
Ice hockey people from British Columbia
Bellingham Blazers players